Forrest N. Iandola is an American computer scientist. He earned a PhD in Electrical Engineering and Computer Science from UC Berkeley in 2016, advised by Kurt Keutzer. As part of his dissertation he co-authored SqueezeNet, a deep neural network for image classification that is optimized for smartphones and other mobile devices.

Iandola and Keutzer went on to co-found a company called DeepScale. The firm squeezes deep neural networks onto low-cost automotive grade processors for use in driver assistance systems. Tesla acquired DeepScale in 2019.

In 2020, he co-authored SqueezeBERT, an efficient neural network for natural language processing.

References

Further reading 
 

American computer scientists
Machine learning researchers
Living people
Year of birth missing (living people)